

Government Museum, Mathura, commonly referred to as Mathura museum, is an archaeological museum in Mathura city of Uttar Pradesh state in India. The museum was founded by then collector of the Mathura district, Sir F. S. Growse in 1874. Initially, it was known as Curzon Museum of Archaeology, then Archaeology Museum, Mathura, and finally changed to the Government Museum, Mathura.

Overview

The museum houses artifacts pottery, sculptures, paintings, and coins primarily from in and around Mathura, plus discoveries made by noted colonial archaeologists like Alexander Cunningham, F. S. Growse, and Fuhrer.
The museum is famous for ancient sculptures of the Mathura school dating from 3rd century BC to 12th century AD., during Kushan Empire and Gupta Empire. today it is one of the leading museums of Uttar Pradesh.

The Government of India issued a postage stamp on 9 October 1974 on the centenary of the museum.

Notable collections

See also
 Mathura lion capital

References

Bharat Online – Mathura Museum

Further reading
Sharma, R. C. 1976. Mathura Museum and Art. 2nd revised and enlarged edition. Government Museum, Mathura.
Growse, F. S. 1882. Mathura A District Memoir.
Kumar, Jitendera. Masterpieces Of Mathura Museum. Sundeep Prakashan.  .

External links

 Mathura Museum
 Mathura, a District Memoir

Museums in Uttar Pradesh
Archaeological museums in India
History of Uttar Pradesh
Museums established in 1874
1874 establishments in British India
Tourist attractions in Mathura
State museums in India